The Buninyong Line (also known as "Bunny Hop Line", or simply "The Bunny") was a Victorian Railways (Australia) branch line, which ran south from Ballarat to the town of Buninyong. The line branched from the main Melbourne – Ballarat railway at Ballarat East station and was 11 km long. The line was opened on 11 September 1889, with traffic commencing the following day.

The line was closed to passenger services in November 1930. The section from Eureka to Buninyong was closed on 2 February 1947, leaving a short branch to Eureka, which closed on 1 December 1986.

Stations

1890
In the 1890s, the stations on the line were as follows:
 Ballarat
 Ballarat East
 Eureka
 Canadian
 Mount Clear
 Buninyong

1900
Additional stations were added in the early 1900s.
 Ballarat
 Ballarat East
 Eureka
 Spencer Crossing
 Canadian (originally named Butts)
 Mount Clear
 Mount Helen
 Buninyong

1910–1930
During this period, stations were added and/or renamed. On 24 November 1930, the Buninyong line was closed to passenger traffic and mixed trains. Goods trains continued to run as required.
 Ballarat
 Ballarat East
 Eureka
 York Street
 Levy
 Canadian
 Mount Clear
 Reid
 Mount Helen
 Buninyong

1930–1947
During the 1940s, five stations were closed, and the line continued to be used for goods traffic until 1947.

Tenders for the removal and disposal of station buildings at Mount Helen and Canadian were called for in January 1932. The last remaining building after that was the stationmaster's cottage at Buninyong.

 Ballarat
 Ballarat East
 Eureka
 Canadian
 Buninyong

During World War II, an army camp was established at Buninyong, which resulted in a temporary increase in good services to one per day

1947–1986
During this time, the station and sidings at Eureka were the only part of the line being used. That section was officially closed on 1 December 1986.

References

External links 
 Victorian Railways Grades and curves diagram of the line
 Photos : Remains of the line in 2008
 Photo: Train at Buninyong circa 1904
 Railpage Australia: Discussion about the line

Closed regional railway lines in Victoria (Australia)
Railway lines opened in 1889